Campaign Law is a 1984 role-playing game supplement published by Iron Crown Enterprises for Rolemaster.

Contents
Campaign Law is the original version of the campaign guidelines for Rolemaster, and describes how to set up and run a campaign and includes the scenario "World of Vog Mur".

Publication history
Campaign Law was written by Peter C. Fenlon and John David Ruemmler, with a cover by Dean Morrisey, and was published by Iron Crown Enterprises in 1984 as a 56-page book.

ICE opted to give Rolemaster a setting when they published their fifth Rolemaster core book, Campaign Law (1984). Campaign Law described how to run an entire campaign — making it one of the earliest GM guidebooks on the markets. Campaign Law reintroduced the setting of Loremaster through three new islands collectively called "The World of Vog Mur."

Reviews
Dragon #88 (Aug., 1984)

References

Role-playing game supplements introduced in 1984
Rolemaster supplements